The 2022–23 UC Davis Aggies men's basketball team represented the University of California, Davis in the 2022–23 NCAA Division I men's basketball season. The Aggies, led by 12th-year head coach Jim Les, played their home games at the University Credit Union Center in Davis, California as members of the Big West Conference.

Previous season
The Aggies finished the 2021–22 season 13–11, 5–6 in Big West play to finish in seventh place. They defeated Cal Poly in the first round of the Big West tournament, before falling to eventual tournament champion Cal State Fullerton in the quarterfinals.

Roster

Schedule and results

|-
!colspan=12 style=""| Non-conference regular season

|-
!colspan=12 style=""| Big West regular season

|-
!colspan=12 style=| Big West tournament

Sources

References

UC Davis Aggies men's basketball seasons
UC Davis
UC Davis Aggies men's basketball
UC Davis Aggies men's basketball